{{DISPLAYTITLE:C16H21NO}}
The molecular formula C16H21NO (molar mass: 243.344 g/mol, exact mass: 243.1623 u) may refer to:

 3-Hydroxymorphinan (3-HM), or morphinan-3-ol
 Norlevorphanol

Molecular formulas